The 1980 Minnesota Twins season was a season in American baseball. The Twins finished 77–84, third in the American League West. 769,206 fans attended Twins games, the lowest total in the American League.

Offseason 
 December 3, 1979: 1979 rule 5 draft
Doug Corbett was drafted by the Twins from the Cincinnati Reds.
Guy Sularz was drafted by the Twins from the San Francisco Giants.
 December 5, 1979: Jeff Holly was traded by the Twins to the Detroit Tigers for Fernando Arroyo.
 January 6, 1980: Albert Williams was signed as a free agent by the Twins.

Regular season 
On May 31, outfielder Ken Landreaux went 0 for 4, ending his hitting streak at 31 games.  This set a Minnesota Twins record that has yet to be topped.

Landreaux tripled three times July 3, in a 10-3 win over the Texas Rangers, to tie an American League record.  This Twins record remained untouched until Denard Span matched it on June 29, 2010.

Landreaux, a Los Angeles native, is the only Twins player to make the All-Star Game at Dodger Stadium.

One of the club's most unusual games was played in Toronto on Thursday, August 28, a game in which one player was replaced after being injured in a car crash during the game and that featured a rare save by a Twins starting pitcher.  A game that ended with the Blue Jays' mound ace playing left field.  The Canadian National Exhibition (like a state fair) was set up adjacent to Exhibition Stadium.  Because of a schedule evening concert by the rock group The Cars, no inning would be able to start past 5:00 PM; the game was begun at 1:00 PM to avoid the curfew.  However, the game went into extra innings and was suspended in the 15th inning, to be finished the following afternoon.  During the evening hours Thursday, Bombo Rivera was injured in a car crash with Toronto's Otto Velez and neither could resume playing Friday.  Friday's scheduled starter Dave Stieb played left field for the final inning of the Thursday game when the Jays ran out of position players (he'd go on to lose the Friday game). Minnesota's John Verhoeven got the win, and starter Albert Williams, who faced four batters in the fifteenth inning, got the save.

On September 18, at Milwaukee for a double-header, outfielder Gary Ward hit a double, single, homer and triple in the first game, becoming the sixth Twin to hit for the cycle.  It came, however, in a losing effort as the 9-8 win by the Brewers was the only time—of the ten Minnesota cycles—that Minnesota has lost the game in which a Twin cycled.  Ward became part of history in 2004 when, on May 26, his son Daryle Ward hit for the cycle for Pittsburgh, and they became the only father-son duo to accomplish the feat.

Infielder John Castino led the team in most of the major offensive categories, batting .302 with 13 HR and 64 RBI. Shortstop Roy Smalley hit 12 HR and collected 63 RBI. Ken Landreaux batted .281 with 7 HR and 62 RBI.

Reliever Doug Corbett replaced Mike Marshall as manager Gene Mauch's all-purpose reliever, racking up 8 relief wins along with 23 saves.  His saves total set a major league rookie record.  Only veterans Jerry Koosman (16-13) and Geoff Zahn (14-18) had double digit wins.

Season standings

Record vs. opponents

Notable transactions 
 April 1, 1980: Guy Sularz was returned by the Twins to the San Francisco Giants.
 April 3, 1980: Paul Hartzell was released by the Twins.
 April 3, 1980: Bob Randall was released by the Twins.
 May 16, 1980: Bob Randall was signed as a free agent by the Twins.
 June 3, 1980: Bob Randall was released by the Twins.
 June 6, 1980: Mike Marshall was released by the Twins.
 June 18, 1980: Bob Randall was signed as a free agent by the Twins.
 July 16, 1980: Bob Randall was released by the Twins.

Roster

Player stats

Batting

Starters by position 
Note: Pos = Position; G = Games played; AB = At bats; H = Hits; Avg. = Batting average; HR = Home runs; RBI = Runs batted in

Other batters 
Note: G = Games played; AB = At bats; H = Hits; Avg. = Batting average; HR = Home runs; RBI = Runs batted in

Pitching

Starting pitchers 
Note: G = Games pitched; IP = Innings pitched; W = Wins; L = Losses; ERA = Earned run average; SO = Strikeouts

Other pitchers 
Note: G = Games pitched; IP = Innings pitched; W = Wins; L = Losses; ERA = Earned run average; SO = Strikeouts

Relief pitchers 
Note: G = Games pitched; W = Wins; L = Losses; SV = Saves; ERA = Earned run average; SO = Strikeouts

Farm system

Notes

References 

Player stats from www.baseball-reference.com
Team info from www.baseball-almanac.com

Minnesota Twins seasons
Minnesota Twins season
1980 in sports in Minnesota